Gerrhonotus lazcanoi is a species of lizard of the Anguidae family. It is found in Mexico.

References

Gerrhonotus
Reptiles of Mexico
Reptiles described in 2017
Taxobox binomials not recognized by IUCN